The Arkansas–Pine Bluff Golden Lions men's basketball team is the men's basketball team that represents the University of Arkansas at Pine Bluff in Pine Bluff, Arkansas, United States. The school's team currently competes in the Southwestern Athletic Conference and led the conference in average home attendance for six consecutive years (2009–2015).

Postseason results

NCAA tournament results
The Golden Lions have appeared in the NCAA tournament one time. Their record is 1–1.

References

External links